The canton of Étaples is a canton situated in the Pas-de-Calais département and in the Hauts-de-France region of France.

Geography 
An area of coastland, small valleys and plateaux, consisting mostly of seaside and farmland, with the town of Étaples in the arrondissement of Montreuil at its centre.

Composition 
At the French canton reorganisation which came into effect in March 2015, the canton was reduced from 19 to 15 communes:

Bréxent-Énocq
Camiers
Cormont
Cucq
Étaples
Frencq
Lefaux
Longvilliers
Maresville
Merlimont
Saint-Aubin
Saint-Josse
Le Touquet-Paris-Plage
Tubersent
Widehem

Population

See also 
 Cantons of Pas-de-Calais
 Communes of Pas-de-Calais

References

Etaples